The following is a list of current notable sannyasis  (the renounced order of life within the Hindu system of asramas) in the International Society for Krishna Consciousness (ISKCON). Sannyasis are authorised by the Governing Body Commission after rigorous assessment and referral by the ISKCON Sannyasa Ministry. Only senior, advanced ISKCON devotees may become sannyasis through a special initiation. The sannyasis in ISKCON are considered enlightened teachers and are required not to establish any permanent residence, constantly traveling and preaching instead.

See also
 List of International Society for Krishna Consciousness members and patrons

Notes

External links 
 ISKCON Sannyasa Ministry
 ISKCON Crimes & Hidden Stories
 List of Current ISKCON Leaders

International Society for Krishna Consciousness
Gaudiya religious leaders
Hindu monks
Hinduism-related lists